Geevarghese Mor Barnabas is the auxiliary metropolitan of Niranam Diocese of the Malankara Jacobite Syriac Orthodox Church.

Education

 B.A in Economics from Catholicate College Pathanamthitta
 B.D from Serampore University
 G.S.T from Orthodox Theological Seminary, Kottayam
 Post Graduation in Theology from Saint Vladimir's Orthodox Theological Seminary

See also

References

1953 births
Living people
Syriac Orthodox Church bishops
Indian Oriental Orthodox Christians